is a ship classification society.

"ClassNK," also known by its brand name, is a non-profit, non-governmental organization dedicated to ensuring the safety of life and property at sea and preventing marine pollution. The Society's expert technical staff performs surveys to ensure that the rules it has developed are applied to both new and existing ships, ensuring their safety. These rules cover hull structures, safety equipment, cargo handling gear, engines, machinery, electrical and electronic systems, among other things.

As of December 2007, the Society had 6,793 ships with a total of 152.22 million gross tons under its class, representing about 20% of the world merchant fleet currently under class. Although based in Japan, ClassNK has worldwide representation through its network of exclusive surveyor offices. Its surveyors work at shipbuilding and repair yards and ports around the world, examining ships wherever they are needed. On November 15, 1999, Nippon Kaiji Kyokai celebrated its 100th anniversary. On May 28, 2012, ClassNK officially announced that its register had surpassed the 200 million gross ton mark, making it the world's first class society in history with more than 200 million gross tons on its register.

Main Activities of ClassNK 
ClassNK offers a wide range of services, including ship classification surveys, statutory surveys, and certification on behalf of Flag States based on international conventions, codes, national statutes, and ClassNK's own rules and regulations. The organization also provides assessment and certification services for the safety management systems of ship management companies and the quality systems of ship builders and related manufacturers, acting as an independent third party. In addition, ClassNK offers appraisal, consulting, and supervisory services for both marine and non-marine related projects.

Ship classification related services 
Approval of service providers, manufacturers and manufacturing methods
Inspection of materials, equipment and similar products
Survey and registration of ship installations, machinery and appliances of new ships
Survey and registration of ships and offshore structures during construction
Survey and inspection of ships, offshore structures and related installations in service
Testing and inspection of material and other types of testing machines

Statutory services 
Activities concerned with the certification of freight containers
Appraisal of grain loading
Assignment of freeboard
Assignment of load limits for cargo handling appliances
Audit and certification of safety management systems based on the ISM Code
Statutory survey and certification services based on SOLAS, ILLC, MARPOL and other international conventions and codes on behalf of flag state administrations

Assessment and registration services
Assessment and registration of environmental management systems based on the ISO14001 standards
Assessment and registration of quality systems based on the ISO9000 series of quality standards

Technical services 
Appraisal and certification of ships and offshore structures
Commissioned testing, research and computer analysis services
Inspection and certification of non-marine machinery and equipment
Technical consulting regarding ships and offshore structures
Tonnage measurement and certification services

ClassNK is one of the seven founding members of the International Association of Classification Societies, otherwise known as IACS.

External links 
ClassNK official website
IACS – International Association of Classification Societies

Trade associations based in Japan
Water transport in Japan
Ship classification societies